The 1926 Combined English Universities by-election was held on 8–12 March 1926.  The by-election was held due to the resignation of the incumbent Liberal MP, H. A. L. Fisher.  It was won by the Conservative candidate Alfred Hopkinson.

References

1926 in England
1926 elections in the United Kingdom
By-elections to the Parliament of the United Kingdom in the Combined English Universities
March 1926 events